Liz Fekete is director of the Institute of Race Relations, where she has worked since 1982. She researches racism, Islamophobia and far-right extremism in Europe. She also speaks to the media on these topics. Fekete was a member of the Campaign Against Racism and Fascism (CARF).

Fekete's book A Suitable Enemy: Racism, migration and Islamophobia in Europe (Pluto Press, 2009) argued that European racism was shifting towards xenoracism in which discrimination operated on the level of religion or culture rather than skin colour. Reviewing it in the journal Translocations: Migration and Social Change, Kathleen M. Coll said it was an "utterly absorbing and deeply disturbing analysis of the recent rise of Islamophobia throughout Europe". In 2017, Fekete published Europe’s Fault Lines: Racism and the Rise of the Right on Verso Books. It was reviewed by Peace News, which commented that it equips a reader with the "intellectual arsenal to begin resisting fascism in all its guises." The Dublin Review of Books observed that she considers racism and fascism must be considered together.

Selected works

References 

Year of birth missing (living people)
Scholars of Islamophobia
Academics and writers on far-right extremism
Living people